Radosław Michalski (born 26 September 1969, in Gdańsk) is a retired Polish football defender. and current board member at the Polish FA.

Before becoming a footballer he worked alongside Lech Wałęsa at the Gdańsk Shipyard.

As a player he scored the crucial goal against Brøndby IF which qualified Widzew Łódź for the Champions League group stage in 1996.

After retiring he became worked in the developer industry before coming back to football to become sporting director at Lechia Gdańsk, then director of the Pomeranian FA, before becoming a board member at the Polish FA in 2012.

References

1969 births
Living people
Sportspeople from Gdańsk
Polish footballers
Polish expatriate footballers
Association football defenders
Ekstraklasa players
Israeli Premier League players
Cypriot First Division players
Legia Warsaw players
Poland international footballers
Widzew Łódź players
Maccabi Haifa F.C. players
Expatriate footballers in Israel
Anorthosis Famagusta F.C. players
Apollon Limassol FC players
Expatriate footballers in Cyprus